The 2014 FIBA Europe Under-16 Championship for Women Division C was the 10th edition of the Division C of the FIBA U16 Women's European Championship, the third tier of the European women's under-16 basketball championship. It was played in Valletta, Malta, from 30 June to 5 July 2014. Scotland women's national under-16 basketball team won the tournament.

Participating teams

Final standings

References

2014
2014–15 in European women's basketball
FIBA U16
International basketball competitions hosted by Malta
FIBA